The 1966 Montana Grizzlies football team represented the University of Montana in the 1966 NCAA College Division football season as a member of the Big Sky Conference (Big Sky). The Grizzlies were led by third-year head coach Hugh Davidson, played their home games at Dornblaser Field, and finished the season with a record of one win and eight losses (1–8, 0–4 Big Sky).

Schedule

References

External links
Montana Grizzlies football – 1966 media guide

Montana
Montana Grizzlies football seasons
Montana Grizzlies football